Rainbow Boulevard is a north–south section line arterial in the Las Vegas Valley. A portion of the road is designated State Route 595 (SR 595).

Rainbow Boulevard description
Rainbow Boulevard begins south of Blue Diamond Road (SR 160) in Clark County and continues north to Horse Drive in northern Las Vegas. Prior to the completion of Durango Drive north of Blue Diamond Road, Rainbow Boulevard was one of only two roads west of I-15 that connected Blue Diamond Road with the developed areas to the north. The other road was Dean Martin Drive (formerly Industrial Road). Decatur Boulevard and Fort Apache Road would soon join them in this distinction.

SR 595 description

The state-maintained portion of Rainbow Boulevard is a designated portion of the National Highway System.

History
Rainbow Boulevard was originally known as Lorenzi Boulevard north of Westcliff Drive. The road got its current name sometime after US 95 (Oran K. Gragson Freeway) was built within the area (a separate Lorenzi Street exists just east of it, from Westcliff to Charleston).

By January 2006, the highway had been truncated to its current terminus at Tropicana Avenue.

Major intersections

Public transport
RTC Transit Routes 101: Rainbow and 219: Craig (continuations of each other north and west respectively) function on this road.

See also

References

Streets in the Las Vegas Valley
Transportation in Clark County, Nevada
Transportation in the Las Vegas Valley
Transportation in Las Vegas